San Pietro Clarenza (Sicilian: San Petru Clarenza) is a comune (municipality) in the Metropolitan City of Catania in the Italian region Sicily, located about  southeast of Palermo and about  northwest of Catania.

San Pietro Clarenza borders the following municipalities: Belpasso, Camporotondo Etneo, Catania, Mascalucia, Misterbianco.

References

Cities and towns in Sicily